Qazi Maulana Fazlullah (Urdu: مولانا قاضی فضل اللہ ایڈوکیٹ) is a Pakistani Islamic scholar based in California, United States.

Education
He studied at Wafaq ul Madaris Al-Arabia, Pakistan, University of Peshawar and International Islamic University Islamabad in Pakistan. He specializes in Law, Economics, and Political Science.

Political career
He served as parliamentarian of the 10th National Assembly of Pakistan from 15 October 1993 to 5 November 1996.

Literary work 
His books include:

References

Living people
Pakistani Islamic religious leaders
Pakistani MNAs 1993–1996
Jamiat Ulema-e-Islam politicians
Pakistani Sunni Muslim scholars of Islam
International Islamic University, Islamabad alumni
University of Peshawar alumni
People from Swabi District
Members of the National Assembly of Pakistan
Year of birth missing (living people)